Katherine Rake  is director of Lucent, a consultancy supporting organisations with a social purpose to see clearly, make connections and inspire change. She was previously chief executive of HealthWatch England, the Family and Parenting Institute and the Fawcett Society. She is currently trustee of the charity United Response and has held a range of trustee and governing roles including as Governor of the London School of Economics, trustee of Centre for Ageing Better and Chair of RISE Mutual. Katherine was formerly a lecturer in social policy at LSE during which time she was seconded to the Cabinet Office. Katherine has advised the Prime Minister's Policy Unit, HM Treasury and other Government departments. In 2008, Katherine was appointed an OBE for services to equal opportunities, an Institute of Directors 'Good Director' Honour and the Social Policy Association's Annual Award for Outstanding Contribution from a Non-academic.

References

Living people
Academics of the London School of Economics
Officers of the Order of the British Empire
1968 births